Maxwell John Phipps (18 November 1939 – 6 August 2000) was an Australian actor, known for a number of roles in theatre, films and television during the 1960s until the end of the 1990s.

Life and career

Phipps was born in Dubbo and grew up in Parkes.  He started his acting training in Sydney at the age of 21, at the Ensemble Theatre.  There he appeared in such productions as Buffalo Skinner, Long Day's Journey into Night, Fortune and Men's Eyes, The Removalists and Rooted.  In the Sydney Opera House's inaugural season he played Harry Bustle in What If You Died Tomorrow?.  In London he reprised this role, as well as appearing in Don's Party. He played Dr Frank-N-Furter in The Rocky Horror Show in Melbourne in 1975–77.
 
His most notable screen roles included Bernie Dump in The Miraculous Mellops, The Toadie in Mad Max 2 (1981), Prime Minister Gough Whitlam in the television mini-series The Dismissal (1983), Sir Frank Packer in True Believers (1988), and Queensland Police Commissioner Terry Lewis in the Four Corners TV documentary drama Police State (1989), which helped to bring about investigations into corruption within that state's police force and political system.  He was nominated for an AFI award for his role in Stir (1980).  Other films included The Cars That Ate Paris (1974), Thirst (1979), Nightmares (1980), Dead Easy (1982), The Return of Captain Invincible (1983), Savage Islands (1983), which was released in the United States as Nate and Hayes, Sky Pirates (1986) and What the Moon Saw (1990). He appeared as Detective Inspector Mcallister in the Inspector Morse episode "The Promised Land" in 1991, which was set in Australia. Phipps also played the role of Edward "Dinosaur" Spence in the first season of the short lived Australian television series "FIRE" (1995) set in Queensland.

in the early to late 90s He also briefly worked on the ill-fated video game Wizardry: Stones of Arnhem at DirectSoft which was being contracted out to them by Sirtech.

Death

He died from cancer in Sydney in August 2000, survived by his three siblings.  He had never married.

Partial filmography
You Can't See 'round Corners (1969) - Keith Grayson
The Cars That Ate Paris (1974) - Mulray
Temperament Unsuited (1979) - Supervisor
Thirst (1979) - Mr. Hodge
Stir (1980) - Norton
Nightmares (1980) - George D'alberg
Mad Max 2 (1981) - The Toadie
Dead Easy (1982) - Francis
The Return of Captain Invincible (1983) - Admiral
Savage Islands (1983) - Ben Pease
Emoh Ruo (1985) - Sam Tregado
Sky Pirates (1986) - Savage
Dark Age (1987) - John Besser
Sky Trackers TV Movie (1990)
What the Moon Saw (1990) - Mr. Zachary
Halifax f.p. (1996) - Det. Insp. Derrida (1 episode)

External links
 

Australian male film actors
Australian male television actors
Australian male stage actors
People from Dubbo
1939 births
2000 deaths
20th-century Australian male actors
Deaths from cancer in New South Wales